The West Coast Avengers is a fictional group of superheroes appearing in American comic books published by Marvel Comics. The team first appeared in The West Coast Avengers #1 (Sept. 1984), created by Roger Stern and Bob Hall. It was the first spin-off publication for the Avengers.

Publication history
The West Coast Avengers first appear in a four-issue limited series published from September to December 1984. The series was written by Roger Stern and drawn by Bob Hall and Brett Breeding. This was followed by a 102-issue series of the same name that ran from October 1985 to January 1994. The series was initially written by Steve Englehart and drawn by Al Milgrom and Joe Sinnott. It was the first spin-off series for the Avengers. From issue #42 to 57, the title was written and illustrated by John Byrne. The series was renamed Avengers West Coast on the cover of issue #47 (Aug. 1989) and in the indicia in issue #48 (Sept. 1989). Writers Roy and Dann Thomas and artist Paul Ryan became the new creative team with issue #60 and Dave Ross replaced Ryan with issue #71. The second series was accompanied by eight annuals published from 1986 to 1993.

In 2018, a new incarnation of the West Coast Avengers appeared in the "Fresh Start" that consists of Hawkeye, Kate Bishop, Gwenpool, America Chavez, Quentin Quire, and Kate's boyfriend Johnny Watts who takes the codename Fuse. This series was cancelled as of issue #10 cover dated June 2019.

Fictional team biography
The team is founded by the Avenger Hawkeye in response to a suggestion by fellow Avenger, the Vision, who at the time (as team chairman) wished to expand the Avengers' influence.  Hawkeye recruits Mockingbird, Wonder Man, Tigra, and Iron Man, with the last actually being Jim Rhodes as opposed to Tony Stark, a fact initially unknown to the team. Together the team defeat a petty criminal called the Blank and later the Avengers foe Graviton.

The team would later take on Henry Pym as a scientific advisor and compound manager and battle a range of both old foes – including the Grim Reaper, Ultron, Graviton, and Zodiac – and new opponents such as Master Pandemonium. Former Fantastic Four member Thing and the heroine Firebird briefly allied themselves with the team. Henry Pym, who is saved by Firebird from a suicide attempt, and the adventurer Moon Knight formally join, while Iron Man is expelled for his actions during the Armor Wars. The "Lost in Space-Time" storyline began in issue #17 (February 1987) when Dominus sent the team back in time. The marriage of Hawkeye and Mockingbird is placed in jeopardy when, during this arc, she allows the Old West hero the Phantom Rider to die in a fall for deceiving and raping her.

After a trip to Hungary to investigate a report on Pym's second wife, the Wasp, the Scarlet Witch, and the Vision assist the team. Mockingbird, Tigra and Moon Knight leave the team together as a new short lived team called the Ex-WACOs over the Avengers rule of not killing in regards to Mockingbird's encounter with Phantom Rider. The Vision and the Scarlet Witch join the team as to not leave it short handed. Former Avenger ally Mantis makes a brief appearance. Agents from multiple governments then abduct the Vision and dismantle him due to his return to the team. The Avengers recover the parts and Dr. Pym rebuilds the Vision but with a chalk-white complexion. Wonder Man, however, does not allow his brain patterns to be used again to provide a matrix for the Vision's emotions, explaining that the original process, done without his consent, had "ripped out his soul". Although Wonder Man's own love for the Scarlet Witch leads him to feel guilt, he justifies his actions by claiming the Vision was never anything but a copy of him, a claim that a number of other Avengers, including the Wasp, accept. This, along with damage to the Vision's synthetic skin when he was dismantled, results in the synthezoid's resurrection as a colorless and emotionless artificial human. The unstable U.S. Agent is assigned to the team as a watchdog by the US government to monitor the team's activities.

A group of odd super-humans decide to mimic the Avengers and become the Great Lakes Avengers, while the original Human Torch returns from his own apparent demise. This casts doubt on the Vision's identity, who was previously believed to have been created from the Torch's body. The Vision and the Scarlet Witch's children conceived via the Scarlet Witch's hex powers are then revealed to be fragments of the soul of the demon Mephisto, who had been broken apart by Franklin Richards shortly before the birth of the twins. The twins were absorbed back into Mephisto, which temporarily drives the Scarlet Witch insane. Although she eventually recovers, the Scarlet Witch and the Vision separate, each operating on a different Avengers team.

Iron Man rejoins, and the mutant Quicksilver assists the team when the Scarlet Witch aligns herself with their father Magneto during a period in which she suffers from a mental breakdown. Immortus is finally confronted and revealed to be the cause of much of the team's misfortune, and is finally defeated. Hank Pym, the Wasp and Quicksilver then leave the team, with Machine Man becoming reservists and Spider-Woman and the Living Lightning joining as full-time members. Spider-Man guest-stars in issues #84–86.

The team battle Ultron and his new creation Alkhema several times, and Hawkeye assumes his old identity of Goliath, during the Avengers crossover Operation: Galactic Storm, and reconciles with Mockingbird. Iron Man and Wonder Man leave the team, and are replaced by War Machine (Jim Rhodes, one of the founding West Coast Avengers) and Darkhawk, with the latter acting as a reservist. During a battle with the demons Mephisto and Satannish, Mockingbird is killed. Due to constant in-fighting and a general lack of organization, Captain America intervenes and disbands the team. Several members of the West Coast team—including a returned Iron Man—are unhappy about the decision and leave to form another team, called Force Works. This team, however, has several setbacks and quickly disbands, with the members returning to the main Avengers team.

Years later, the West Coast Avengers compound would be reopened as the new campus for the Avengers Academy following the destruction of the Infinite Avengers Mansion as seen in the Fear Itself storyline.

During the Fresh Start relaunch, both Hawkeyes – team founder Clint Barton and his successor Kate Bishop – decided to revive the West Coast Avengers following an attack by land sharks in Santa Monica. For that, they recruited America Chavez and Kate's boyfriend Johnny "Fuse" Watts, who helped in the mission, and were eventually joined by Gwenpool and Kid Omega. Given their lack of funds, the newly formed team tried to get financiers by starring in a reality show following their exploits.

Other versions

Ultimate Marvel
In the Ultimate Marvel reality, a secret team of Ultimates was formed in the Ultimate Comics: Ultimates. The team members include Quake as the leader, Wonder Man, the Vision, the Black Knight, and Tigra. The team was assigned to kill a wanted terrorist until Wonder Man went unstable. This forced the abandonment of the mission and Nick Fury put the team into stasis until needed. Fury and S.H.I.E.L.D. had planned to use them against the villainous Reed Richards and his Children of Tomorrow, but thanks to the civil war, California Governor Ford discovered the newly christened West Coast Ultimates and set them against the Ultimates.

Collected editions

In other media
 Hawkeye's ending in the video game Ultimate Marvel vs. Capcom 3 sees him forming a new iteration of the West Coast Avengers, consisting of himself, Mockingbird, War Machine, Tigra, Wonder Man, and Moon Knight, as well as Capcom characters Jin Saotome, June Lin Milliam, Rikuo, Leo and Rei.
 Rapper Del the Funky Homosapien released a trilogy of mixtapes called West Coast Avengers, though the track listings are unrelated to the comics' group.

References

External links

 West Coast Avengers limited series and West Coast Avengers ongoing series/Avengers West Coast at the Unofficial Handbook of Marvel Comics Creators

1984 comics debuts
1984 comics endings
1985 comics debuts
1994 comics endings
2018 comics debuts
2019 comics endings
Avengers (comics) titles
Comics by John Byrne (comics)
Comics by Roger Stern
Comics by Roy Thomas
Comics by Steve Englehart
Marvel Comics superhero teams